A legal fiction is a fact assumed or created by courts, which is then used in order to help reach a decision or to apply a legal rule. The concept is used almost exclusively in common law jurisdictions,  particularly in England and Wales.

Development of the concept 
A legal fiction typically allows the court to ignore a fact that would prevent it from exercising its jurisdiction by simply assuming that the fact is different. In cases where the court must determine whether a standard has been reached, such as whether a defendant has been negligent, the court frequently uses the legal fiction of the "reasonable man". This is known as the "objective test", and is far more common than the "subjective test" where the court seeks the viewpoint of the parties (or "subjects"). Sometimes, the court may apply a "mixed test", as in the House of Lords' decision in DPP v Camplin 1978.

Legal fictions are different from legal presumptions which assume a certain state of facts until the opposite is proved, such as the presumption of legitimacy.  A legal fiction, by contrast, can be seen in laws recognizing "virgin birth", i.e., that a child born to an unmarried mother has no biological, psychological, or sociological father. They are different from hypothetical examples, such as the 'reasonable person' which serve as tools for the court to express its reasoning.  They are also different from legal principles which create a legal state of affairs that is different from the underlying facts, such as corporate personhood although these are sometimes wrongly called legal fictions.

The term legal fiction is sometimes used in a pejorative way. Jeremy Bentham was a famous historical critic of legal fictions. Proponents of legal fictions, particularly their use historically (for example, before DNA evidence could give every child the ability to have both genetic parents determined), identify legal fictions as "scaffolding around a building under construction".

Examples
It is a legal fiction that the English courts do not "create" new law but merely "declare" the common law that has existed since time immemorial.

Adoption
Once an order or judgment of adoption is entered, the biological parents become legal strangers to the child, legally no longer related nor with any rights related to the child. Conversely, the adoptive parents are legally considered to be parents of the adopted child. A new birth certificate reflecting this is issued, which is a legal fiction.

Doctrine of survival 

If two or more people die within a period of time or in a manner that renders it impossible to tell the order in which they died, the older of the two is considered to have died first.

Ejectment
The common law had a procedure whereby title to land could be put in direct issue, called the "writ of right". The defendant could insist on trial by "wager of battle", that is trial by combat, a judicially sanctioned duel. To avoid the plaintiff staking life and limb, a tale was told in the pleadings about how one John Doe leased land from the plaintiff but was ousted by Richard Roe, who claimed a contrary lease from the defendant. Such events would lead to the "mixed action in ejectment", a procedure to determine title via trial by jury. This is the origin of the names John Doe and Richard Roe for anonymous parties. The fiction of Doe, Roe, and the leases was not challenged by the parties unless they wished to stake their life on a trial by combat. Wager of battle fell into disuse by the end of the thirteenth century though it was not abolished in England until 1819.

Jurisdiction of the Exchequer

In England a legal fiction extended the jurisdiction of the Court of the Exchequer to all types of cases involving debt. The Exchequer had a much lighter caseload than the King's Bench and other courts in England. Litigants would commence an action in the Exchequer Court by pleading that they owed money to the King, which they could not pay because their debtor had in turn wrongfully withheld payment to them. The debt owed to the King became a legal fiction in that the original debtor was not entitled to controvert this allegation in order to oust the Exchequer from jurisdiction.

Jurisdiction of the Court of King's Bench

The Bill of Middlesex was a legal fiction used by the Court of King's Bench to gain jurisdiction over cases traditionally in the remit of the Court of Common Pleas. Hinging on the King's Bench's retaining criminal jurisdiction over the county of Middlesex, the Bill allowed it to take cases traditionally in the remit of other common law courts by claiming that the defendant had committed trespass in Middlesex. Once the defendant was in custody, the trespass complaint would be quietly dropped and other complaints (such as debt or detinue) would be substituted.

Resignation from Parliament

In 1623 a rule was declared that Members of Parliament were given a trust to represent their constituencies and therefore were not at liberty to resign. However, an MP who accepted an "office of profit" from the Crown (including appointment as a minister) was obliged to leave the House and seek re-election, because it was thought his independence might be compromised if he were in the King's pay. The device was invented that the MP who wished to quit applied to the King for the post of "Steward of the Chiltern Hundreds" or "Steward of the Manor of Northstead" with no duties or income, but legally an office of profit in the King's gift. The first MP to avail himself of the Chiltern Hundreds to leave Parliament was John Pitt in 1751. The requirement for ministerial re-election has been abolished, but the "Chiltern Hundreds" mechanism remains to enable MPs to resign.

Surviving fictions
The fiction about Doe left homeless by Roe has been abolished in every common law jurisdiction. The fiction of Doe and Roe being the guardians of undisclosed parties who wish to bring suit, or the names of parties unknown, remains in some jurisdictions although not in England. The doctrine of survival, although still existing in England, has been abolished in many U.S. states by the Uniform Simultaneous Death Act. Some legal fictions have been invalidated as contrary to public policy, as in the High Court of Australia's rejection in the Mabo cases of the doctrine of terra nullius, the legal fiction that there were no property rights to land in Australia before the time of European colonization.

The 2019 UK prorogation controversy was resolved through the use of legal fiction. Although the United Kingdom Supreme Court found that Prime Minister Boris Johnson's prorogation of parliament had been unlawful, it lacked the authority to order the recall of Parliament. Instead, the legal fiction was maintained that Parliament had never been prorogued; any references to prorogation were expunged from the record, and Parliament was instead recorded as being adjourned, enabling it to reassemble the next day.

Philosophical arguments
William Blackstone defended legal fictions, observing that legislation is never free from the iron law of unintended consequences. Using the metaphor of an ancient castle, Blackstone opined:

Henry Maine, on the other hand, argued that legal fictions seem an ornate outgrowth of the law that ought to be removed by legislation. Jeremy Bentham sharply criticised the notion of legal fictions, saying that "fictions are to law what fraud is to trade."

Use in fiction
In the novel Joan and Peter (1918) by H. G. Wells, Peter's parents die in a sailing accident. As it is not known which parent dies first, a legal fiction is applied maintaining that the husband, being a man and therefore stronger, lived longer which results in the father's will determining Peter's legal guardian. Later in the novel a witness to the accident declares seeing the mother floundering some time after the father has disappeared, and so the legal fiction is overturned and the mother's will is followed, providing Peter with a new legal guardian. Wells was in error as to the English law, which actually presumes that the older person died first.

In Act II, Scene 1 of Gilbert and Sullivan's The Gondoliers, Giuseppe Palmieri (who serves jointly with his brother Marco as King of Barataria) requests that he and his brother be recognized individually, that they might receive individual portions of food as they have two independent appetites. He is turned down because the joint rule "... is a legal fiction, and legal fictions are solemn things."

In the novel Lud-in-the-Mist (1926) by Hope Mirrlees, the concept of the legal fiction as a secular substitute for spiritual mysteries and magical illusions is a central theme. Legal fictions in the novel include referring to fairy fruit, mention of which is taboo, as woven silk fabric in order to allow the law to regulate it; and declaring members of the country's Senate "dead in the eyes of the law" in order to remove them from office, since the senators serve for life.

Limitations on their use

Legal fictions derive their legitimacy from tradition and precedent, rather than formal standing as a source of law. Historically, many legal fictions were created as ad hoc remedies forged to meet a harsh or an unforeseen situation. Conventions and practices over the centuries have imparted a degree of stability both to the institution of legal fictions and to specific legal fictions (such as adoptions and corporate personhood) that have been repeatedly invoked in judicial precedents. While judiciaries retain discretion in the use of legal fictions, some general propositions regarding the appropriateness of using legal fictions might be expressed as follows:

 A legal fiction should not be employed to defeat law or result in illegality: it has been always stressed that a legal fiction should not be employed where it would result in the violation of any legal rule or moral injunction. In Sinclair v. Brougham 1914 AC 378 the House of Lords refused to extend the juridical basis of a quasi-contract to a case of an  borrowing by a limited company, since it would sanction the evasion of the rules of public policy forbidding an  borrowing by a company. In general, if it appears that a legal fiction is being used to circumvent an existing rule, the courts are entitled to disregard that fiction and look at the real facts. The doctrine of "piercing the corporate veil" is applied under those circumstances.
 Legal fiction should operate for the purpose for which it was created and should not be extended beyond its legitimate field.
 Legal fiction should not be extended so as to lead to unjust results. For example, the fiction that the wife's personality is merged in that of the husband should not be extended to deny to the wife of a disqualified man the right to an inheritance when it opens. The wife of a murderer can succeed to the estate of the murdered man in her own right and will not be affected by the husband's disqualification.
 There cannot be a fiction upon a fiction. For example, in Hindu law, where a married person is given in adoption, and such person has a son at the time of adoption, the son does not pass into his father's adoptive family along with his father. He does not lose his gotra and right of inheritance in the family of his birth. The second example would be that the adopted son would by a fiction be a real son of the adoptive father and his wife associated with the adoption. But to say that he will be the real son of all the wives of the adoptive father is a fiction upon fiction.

In religion

 In Judaism, it is forbidden to own any chametz (leavened food) during Passover, and any such products must be burned before the holiday. However, in practice, most Jews will sell all their chametz to a non-Jew before Passover for a nominal sum, typically through a rabbi acting as an agent on their behalf, then buy it back after the holiday ends, eliminating the need to destroy or give away large amounts of food.

See also 
 Ad hoc
 Copyright traps
 De jure
 Fiction

Notes

References

External links